Steele Creek is a river in Herkimer County in the state of New York. The creek begins in an unnamed swamp south of Cedarville, and flows in a northeast direction before emptying into the Mohawk River in the village of Ilion. Steele Creek travels through the Ilion Gorge and alongside NY-51 for most of its length.  Steele Creek derives its name from Rudolph Stahl (Staele, Staley, Steele), who built the first grist mill in Ilion along the creek.

Hydrology

Discharge

The station was in operation from November 1966 to September 1968 and then from October 2014 to now. It also took annual maximum measurements from 1964-1966, 1969, 1971-1983, 1985-1986, and 2000.

Flooding
On January 12, 2018, ice that broke loose by unseasonably high temperatures and rainfall caused ice jams in Steele Creek by Ilion which caused the water to crest over on Otsego Street (NY-51).

History 
Rudolph Stahl built the first grist mill in Ilion on the Steele Creek, at about where the Ilion Episcopal Church sits today.
Sam Newton built a cider mill in "Smokey Run", now known as South Ilion. He built a mill pond on the creek and powered the cider mill and vinegar works, a full blacksmith shop and a first floor wood working shop. Here the first 800 washing machines built in Central New York under a Mitchell Patent. A flood in 1938 took out the mill dam and the back end of the mill.
Along Steele Creek sprang up other various mills. The Dexter oil mill and saw mill about where Weber Avenue is now, the Ingersoll plaster mill and saw mill near Philip Street, and a fulling mill close to present Richfield Street.

References 

Rivers of New York (state)
Rivers of Herkimer County, New York
Mohawk River